Nicolas Tié (born 13 February 2001) is a professional footballer who plays for Portuguese club Vitória de Guimarães, as a goalkeeper. Born in France, he represents Ivory Coast internationally.

Club career
Born in Lille, France, he joined English club Chelsea from Poitiers in July 2017, turning professional in July 2018 on a three-year contract.

In August 2020 he signed for Portuguese club Vitória de Guimarães. in January 2022 he was linked with a transfer to Swiss club St. Gallen.

International career
He was called up by the Ivory Coast national team in October 2018, but withdrew from the squad due to injury. He was selected to the Ivory Coast squad for the delayed 2020 Olympics.

References

2001 births
Living people
Footballers from Lille
French footballers
Ivorian footballers
Association football goalkeepers
Footballers at the 2020 Summer Olympics
Olympic footballers of Ivory Coast
Stade Poitevin FC players
Chelsea F.C. players
Vitória S.C. players
French expatriate footballers
Ivorian expatriate footballers
French expatriate sportspeople in England
Ivorian expatriate sportspeople in England
Expatriate footballers in England
French expatriate sportspeople in Portugal
Ivorian expatriate sportspeople in Portugal
Expatriate footballers in Portugal
Black French sportspeople
Sportspeople from Poitiers
Footballers from Nouvelle-Aquitaine